Healing of the Man Born Blind is a painting of the healing of the man born blind by El Greco, produced in 1567 during his time in Venice. It is now in the Palazzo della Pilotta in Parma, Italy. 

It marks his first use of a space marked by perspective, abandoning the perspective-less Byzantine style in which he had been trained. It shows the heavy influence of Tintoretto, Titian and Veronese. He returned to the subject five years later, in a work now in Parma.

Bibliography
 ÁLVAREZ LOPERA, José, El Greco, Madrid, Arlanza, 2005, Biblioteca «Descubrir el Arte», (colección «Grandes maestros»). .
 SCHOLZ-HÄNSEL, Michael, El Greco, Colonia, Taschen, 2003. .
 https://web.archive.org/web/20101129094512/http://www.artehistoria.jcyl.es/genios/cuadros/6301.htm

1567 paintings
Paintings by El Greco
Collections of the Gemäldegalerie Alte Meister